Nils Eekhoff (born 23 January 1998) is a Dutch cyclist, who currently rides for UCI WorldTeam .

Career
In August 2019, Eekhoff joined UCI WorldTeam  as a stagiaire for the second half of the season, before joining the team permanently in 2020.

At the under 23 road race of the 2019 UCI Road World Championships, Eekhoff initially won the race, but was later disqualified for illegal drafting behind a team car.

Major results

2016 
 1st Stage 4 Peace Race Juniors
 2nd Paris–Roubaix Juniors
 2nd Overall Ronde des Vallées
1st Stage 2
2017
 1st Paris–Roubaix Espoirs
 6th Grand Prix Criquielion
 8th Poreč Trophy
2018
 1st Prologue Istrian Spring Trophy
 2nd Time trial, National Under-23 Road Championships
 3rd Paris–Tours Espoirs
 9th Paris–Bourges
2019
 1st Ronde van Overijssel
 1st Prologue Grand Prix Priessnitz spa
 National Under-23 Road Championships
2nd Road race
4th Time trial
 3rd Overall Tour de Bretagne
1st Stage 7
 5th Road race, UEC European Under-23 Road Championships
 6th Overall Le Triptyque des Monts et Châteaux
 7th Time trial, UCI Road World Under-23 Championships
 8th Paris–Bourges
2020
 2nd Road race, National Road Championships
 2nd Dwars door het Hageland
 7th Bretagne Classic
2021
 6th Overall Boucles de la Mayenne
1st  Young rider classification
 8th Ronde van Drenthe

Grand Tour general classification results timeline

References

External links

1998 births
Living people
Dutch male cyclists
21st-century Dutch people